Although most species in the Red Sea pose no threat to humans, there are a few notable exceptions.

Biting and wounding fish

Stinging and venomous fish

Poisonous fish

Ciguatera poison
Ciguatera poisoning is a danger posed by fish at the top of the food chain, in particular the Twinspot snapper and Giant moray. These fish accumulate a toxin produced by a dinoflagellate which is eaten by their prey species. Ciguatera poisoning can be fatal.

Invertebrates

References

Venomous animals
Fauna of the Red Sea
Fauna of the Indian Ocean
Animal attacks by geographic location